Wohin? is a double-CD studio album released by electro-medieval/darkwave band Helium Vola. It was released February 22, 2013 by Chrom Records.

Track listing

CD1 
 "Nubibus Atris" – 3:05
 "Uf Der Linden" – 4:01
 "A Virgen Santa Maria" – 4:12
 "Witwenklage – 6:32
 "Tanderadan" – 5:11
 "Fama Tuba2" – 5:14
 "E Raynauz, Amis" – 6:07
 "Ich Will Den Sumer Gruezen" – 4:25
 "Die Andre" – 5:52
 "Napuctun Speaks" – 11:22

CD2 
 "The Unquiet Grave" – 7:38
 "Heja, Wie Sie Sang" – 4:46
 "Amor, M'à Posto" – 5:48
 "Rose Am Dorn" – 4:01
 "Excalibur" – 5:22
 "Dirlch" – 6:24
 "Panzer Hymnus" – 6:06
 "Diu Werlt Was Gelf" – 4:47
 "Aquil Altera" – 15:02

Credits 
Artwork by - Bettina Stickel
Composed by Ernst Horn (tracks: 1-1 to 2-5, 2-7 to 2-9)
Coordinator [Promotion and Product Coordination] - Sandra Eichner
Keyboards, Producer - Ernst Horn
Mastered by Christoph Stickel
Translated by [English] Heike Riou
Vocals - Sabine Lutzenberger

References

External links 

2013 albums
Helium Vola albums